Altaf Hussain is a Welsh Conservative politician, serving from 2015 to 2016 and again since re-elected in 2021 as the Member of the Senedd for South Wales West. He is also a retired consultant orthopaedic surgeon.

Prior to dissolution of the fourth assembly, he sat on the Health Committee at the National Assembly for Wales, and was Shadow Minister for Social Services. He was defeated in the 2016 Welsh Assembly elections. In 2017 he was elected to Bridgend County Borough Council. In January 2018 appointed as Chair of the Brynawel Rehab Board of Trustees UK.

Early life and education
Born in Srinagar, India,  and in 1982 was awarded a second Master of Surgery degree, in Orthopaedic surgery, by the University of Liverpool.

Medical career
Hussain was an orthopaedic surgeon for NHS Wales before his selection as a Welsh Conservative Assembly candidate. He was based at the Prince Charles Hospital in Merthyr Tydfil.

As a surgeon, his work in developing the Notch Trial method in total knee replacement surgery was showcased at the World Orthopaedic Conference in November 2013. He also pioneered teaching the thumb index reference technique in total hip replacement when instructing trainee surgeons.

He is a recipient of the Best Practice Team Award 2007 and the Glory of India Award 2008.

Hussain has worked extensively in his native Kashmir to improve access to healthcare in what he calls 'peripheral areas' and worked closely with the Chief Minister, Mufti Mohammad Sayeed in this area.  Hussain's obituary of Sayeed and his account of their professional involvement together was published in the newspapers Greater Kashmir and Rising Kashmir.

He remains active in orthopaedic research and continues to deliver lectures on a 'pro bono' basis.

In September 2016-September 2017 Hussain was appointed a trustee of Age Cymru Swansea Bay.

Political life
Hussain has been a supporter of the UK Conservative Party since the 1980s, and has held several offices in the Welsh Conservative Party, including Deputy Chairman of Bridgend Conservative Association – of which he has been an active member since 2009.  Altaf has served on the Board of the Welsh Conservative Party since 2012, when he was elected as chairman for the South Wales West Area.

In the 2015 United Kingdom general election Hussain stood for the Welsh Conservatives in the Swansea East constituency.

Having fought the 2011 National Assembly for Wales election as a list candidate in South Wales West, Hussain succeeded Byron Davies as an AM in 2015 following Byron Davies' election to Westminster.

In 2015 Hussain was reselected by the Welsh Conservative Party as a regional candidate for South Wales West, but was unsuccessful in the 2016 Welsh Assembly elections.

He has served as a community councillor in Pen-y-fai, Bridgend since 2011 and is a governor of Aberkenfig Catholic School.

Hussain was elected as the Welsh Conservative Councillor for Penyfai in the 2017 local government election for Bridgend County Borough Council. He has lived in the ward has lived for many years.

Hussain was re-elected to the Senedd at the 2021 election, from the regional list for the South West Wales region.

Issues and campaigns

As an Assembly Member, Hussain has campaigned on a number of local and national issues.

He has worked with St John Cymru Wales to further their goal of having a 'first aider on every street', running community first responder training sessions in Swansea as well as working to help bring their cycle responder unit project that has been successfully piloted in Cardiff further west to Swansea and Bridgend. He has also campaigned for all schools in Wales to have defibrillators.

Hussain has been a strong proponent of improving town centres and reducing unoccupancy rates, speaking out about problems with the road layout of Swansea's Kingsway prior to the council making changes. He has argued in the local press for lower business rates, better parking facilities and against the closure of public toilet facilities.  In February 2016 Hussain was criticised by Swansea City Council for calling for the county's education budget to be protected in the latest budget.

He has also taken a close interest on the impact of energy policy on local communities and presented evidence to the public inquiry into the proposed land exchange deal that would allow for the construction of a wind farm at the Mynydd-y-Gwair site near Felindre in the north of Swansea, to which he had formally objected. He has also sought clarity from the Welsh Government on its policy on underground coal bed gasification and has supported local campaigns against exploratory drilling.  Hussain has been a supporter of the Swansea Bay Tidal Lagoon proposal but has argued that an appropriate strike price must be agreed first and the project should not be rushed.

Hussain regularly speaks on matters related to health and social care, campaigning for pro-active 'stay at home assessments' to be offered to anyone so wanting one upon reaching retirement age which he argues will reduce delays in the transfer of patient care from the hospital to the home care setting and will enable older people to remain for longer in their own homes.  He has chaired a number of seminars relating to Health and Social Care policy with the Institute of Welsh Affairs and Policy Forum for Wales, of which he is a patron. In March 2016 Hussain announced the new Welsh Conservative policy of capping care home costs and protecting a minimum level of assets for anyone needing residential care at the party's annual conference as part of an integrated approach to Health and Social Care policy by the party.

In January 2016 he was asked to apologise by the First Minister for suggesting that poor standards in Welsh schools were acting as a deterrent to doctors considering moving to Wales but refused, saying that this was a concerned highlighted by bodies representing senior doctors and demanding instead an apology from the First Minister for his government 'taking its eye off the ball' in what became a heated row. He also called for the new system of measuring ambulance response times in Wales to be scrapped, arguing that they produce incomplete data.
 
Hussain has spoken out to highlight his opposition to the proposed 'sugar tax' and as to whether locum doctors' earnings in Wales should be subject to a cap. He has also expressed his concern about the high levels of anti-depressant prescription by GPs in Wales and called for improved access to talking therapies.

Having written a detailed article about winter pressures in the Welsh NHS in December 2016 for South Wales Evening Post. The newspaper cited his article in calling for a mature and evidence-driven debate on health as one of '20 things we want to see in Swansea in 2016'.

He campaigned against the closure of more hospital beds in the Abertawe Bro Morgannwg University Health Board area.

His other campaigns have included ensuring that communities in Porthcawl are properly protected by the Welsh Government's proposed Shoreline Management Plan, calling for improved classroom access to services for children with autism and moderate learning difficulties and facilitating more frequent bus services to communities in Gower.

Hussain has argued that the committee structure of the Welsh Assembly should be strengthened to make the Welsh Government more accountable to AMs as well as for greater media coverage of proceedings in the Chamber.

Following the announcement in March 2016 that Tata Steel was to sell its UK operation, Hussain was amongst a number of elected politicians who argued that the UK government would be right to take a partial stake in the Port Talbot plant in order to ensure its survival.

In June 2016, Hussain organised a public debate on the forthcoming EU Referendum along with former Aberavon Welsh Assembly candidate David Jenkins, inviting speakers from both sides to present their arguments at Swansea University.

In January 2022, Hussain was noted for criticising his own party's leader, Prime Minister Boris Johnson, citing that he had lost the trust of the public.

References

Year of birth missing (living people)
Living people
Conservative Party members of the Senedd
Wales MSs 2021–2026
Wales AMs 2011–2016
British politicians of Indian descent
Indian emigrants to Wales
People from Srinagar
Welsh people of Kashmiri descent